The 2016 Cork Premier Intermediate Hurling Championship was the 13th staging of the Cork Premier Intermediate Hurling Championship since its establishment by the Cork County Board in 2004. The draw for the opening round of the championship took place at the County Convention on 13 December 2015. The championship began on 21 May 2016 and ended on 9 October 2016.

On 9 October 2016, Bandon won the championship following a 1-20 to 1-14 defeat of Fermoy in the final. This remains their only championship title in the grade.

Fermoy's Liam Coleman was the championship's top scorer with 3-51.

Format change

The 2016 championship saw the introduction of a new double-elimination format. Each team would now be guaranteed at least two games before exiting the championship.

Teams

A total of 16 teams contested the Premier Intermediate Championship, including 15 teams from the 2015 premier intermediate championship and one promoted from the 2015 intermediate championship.

Team changes

To Championship

Promoted from the Cork Intermediate Hurling Championship
 Charleville

From Championship

Promoted to the Cork Senior Hurling Championship
 Newcestown

Results

Round 1

Round 2A

Round 2B

Round 3

Relegation play-offs

Quarter-finals

Semi-finals

Final

Championship statistics

Scoring events

Widest winning margin: 21 points
Mallow 5-22 – 0-16 Tracton (Round 2B)
Most goals in a match: 8
Mallow 6-17 – 2-15 Watergrasshill (Round 3)
Most points in a match: 41
Ballinhassig 3-23 - 0-18 Tracton (Round 1)
Most goals by one team in a match: 6
Mallow 6-17 – 2-15 Watergrasshill (Round 3)
Most goals scored by a losing team: 4
Kilworth 4-11 - 3-16 Fermoy (Round 1)
Most points scored by a losing team: 21 
Carrigaline 0-21 – 2-21 Mallow (Quarter-final)

Top scorers

Top scorer overall

Top scorers in a single game

Miscellaneous

 Bandon completed a hurling-football double by also winning the Cork Intermediate Football Championship. It was also the first time that the club gained promotion to the Cork Senior Hurling Championship.
 Fermoy earned the unwanted distinction of completing a losing double when they also finished as runners-up in the Cork Premier Intermediate Football Championship. Losing both finals to Bandon.
 Ronan Crowley's tally of 1-10 remains a record individual score for a final.

References

External links

 2017 Cork PIHC results

Cork Premier Intermediate Hurling Championship
Cork Premier Intermediate Hurling Championship